Frosted Flakes or Frosties is a breakfast cereal, produced by the Kellogg Company and consisting of sugar-coated corn flakes. It was introduced in the United States, in 1952, as "Sugar Frosted Flakes". The word "sugar" was dropped from the name in 1983. 

Generic versions, such as store brands, are also available. Unlike many cereals, such as Cheerios, Shreddies and Rice Krispies, the name “Frosted Flakes” is so generic that it cannot be trademarked, and thus it often shares its name with competitors.

International names

 Frosted Flakes (U.S. and Canada)
 Frosties (UK, Ireland, Australia, Israel, most Commonwealth nations, and European and Middle East countries; formerly Frostis in Spain)
 Zucaritas in the U.S. and Hispanic America (the word translates as "little sugary things")
 Sucrilhos in Brazil (a fusion of sugar + crunch + milho)
 Corn Frosty (コーンフロスティ) in Japan
 Corn Frost (콘푸로스트) in South Korea

Popularity 
Frosted Flakes was the second-best-selling cereal in the first half of 2017 within the US in gross sales, after Honey Nut Cheerios.

Marketing

Mascots 
Tony the Tiger has been the mascot of Frosted Flakes since its introduction. Tony is known for saying the cereal's slogan: "They're Gr-r-reat!" (the "r"s in "Great" being drawn-out). Tony the Tiger was originally voiced by Dallas McKennon, but Thurl Ravenscroft voiced him for more than 50 years, until his death in 2005. Tony was later voiced (in Canada and the US) by former professional wrestling play-by-play announcer Lee Marshall until his death on April 27, 2014. After Marshall's death, he was replaced with Tex Brashear. In the UK, Tom Hill voiced Tony after Ravenscroft's death. Tony is drawn wearing a red bandana on all Frosted Flakes cereal boxes.

Sponsorship 
 Kellogg's was a major sponsor of Adventures of Superman throughout most of the 1950s. Many of the Frosted Flakes commercials featuring the show's star George Reeves are available on the DVD release of the series' first season.
 Frosted Flakes is a sponsor of Challenger Sports British Soccer Camps.
 From the mid 1990s to the mid 2000s, Frosted Flakes was a sponsor of children's programming on PBS, including Sagwa, Dragon Tales and Barney & Friends.

Varieties
In Canada and the United States:
Frosted Rice, a crisped rice variant introduced in 1977, similar to Frosted Rice Krispies and Ricicles. Featured a younger, similar mascot named Tony Jr.
Birthday Confetti Frosted Flakes, a 1997 cake-flavored version. Discontinued in 1997.
Cocoa Frosted Flakes, a 1997 cocoa-flavored version. Discontinued in 2000.
Tony's Cinnamon Krunchers, a 2003 cinnamon-flavored variant. Discontinued around 2005.
Whole Grain Tiger Power, a 2005 version with added protein, fiber and calcium, very similar to Start. Discontinued in 2006.
Tony's Turboz, a 2005 meal replacement variant similar to Whole Grain Tiger Power. Available only in Canada.
Frosted Flakes Gold, a 2008 honey-flavored variant. Reintroduced in 2018 as Honey Nut Frosted Flakes. 
Frosted Flakes Chocolate, a 2011 chocolate-flavored version. Reintroduced in 2013.
Banana Frosted Flakes, a variant with flakes containing banana introduced in 1981. Discontinued in 1984.
Cinnamon Frosted Flakes, a 2016 cinnamon-flavored version.
Banana Creme Frosted Flakes, a limited edition banana creme-flavored version introduced in 2019.
Cereal With Marshmallows, Variant of frosted flakes that includes vanilla flavored marshmallows
Cinnamon French Toast, New flakes that are bursting with cinnamon sweetness   
Strawberry Milkshake, Strawberry flavor that makes milk into strawberry milk 
Cereal Bar, Bar made with traditional Frosted Flakes and marshmallows holding it together   

In the UK and Ireland:
Toffee Flavoured Frosties, Frosties with the taste of toffee (Tony - New Kelloggs Toffee Flavoured Frosties, an explosion of toffee taste, for a limited time only, they're gr-r-reat!). Limited time only.
Frosties Chocolate, Frosties with the taste of chocolate (Tony - New Kelloggs Frosties Chocolate, discover the dark side!). Discontinued.
Frosties Stripes, Frosties in the shape of thunderbolt symbols. Discontinued.
Reduced Sugar Frosties, Frosties with a third less sugar than regular Frosties.

In Brazil:
Sucrilhos Sabor Chocolate, chocolate-flavored Frosted Flakes.
Sucrilhos Power Pops, chocolate-flavored puffs, as opposed to flakes. Previously known as Sucrilhos Power.
Sucrilhos Sabor Banana, banana-flavored Frosted Flakes. Discontinued.
Sucrilhos Sabor Brigadeiro, brigadeiro-flavored Frosted Flakes. Limited.
Sucrilhos Sabor Canela, cinnamon-flavored Frosted Flakes. Limited.
Sucrilhos Sabor Doce de Leite, dulce de leche-flavored Frosted Flakes. Limited.

In 2020 Sucrilhos also started to be sold in the form of cookies.

In Argentina:
Zucaritas Frutilla, strawberry-flavored Frosted Flakes.
Choco Zucaritas, chocolate-flavored Frosted Flakes.

In Mexico:
Choco Zucaritas, chocolate-flavored Frosted Flakes.

In Colombia:
Zucaritas Arequipe, caramel-flavored Frosted Flakes. Discontinued.
Zucaritas Power Balls, sphere-shaped Frosted Flakes.

Health
Frosted Flakes, under its Australian name of Frosties, received 2 stars out of 5 on the Australian Government's health star ratings.

References

External links

 
 Advert on The Link Portal

Kellogg's cereals
Products introduced in 1952
Flaked breakfast cereals